The scale-crested pygmy tyrant (Lophotriccus pileatus) is a species of bird in the family Tyrannidae.

It was given its name for the small crown-like ring of feathers on the top of its head. It raises these feathers both to attract a mate and to seem larger when frightened.

It is found in Colombia, Costa Rica, Ecuador, Panama, Peru, Venezuela, and possibly Honduras.

Its natural habitats are subtropical or tropical moist lowland forest and subtropical or tropical moist montane forest.

Not much is known about the habits or breeding of the bird.

Gallery

References

scale-crested pygmy tyrant
Birds of Honduras
Birds of Nicaragua
Birds of Costa Rica
Birds of Panama
Birds of the Northern Andes
scale-crested pygmy tyrant
Taxonomy articles created by Polbot